Steve Tupper (6 February 1941 in Vancouver – 4 July 2016) was a Canadian sailor who competed in the 1968 Summer Olympics.

References

1941 births
2016 deaths
Sportspeople from Vancouver
Canadian male sailors (sport)
Olympic sailors of Canada
Sailors at the 1968 Summer Olympics – Dragon